These are the results of the men's floor competition, one of eight events for male competitors in artistic gymnastics at the 1956 Summer Olympics in Melbourne.

Competition format

The gymnastics format continued to use the aggregation format, mostly following the scoring tweaks made in 1952. Each nation entered either a team of six gymnasts or up to three individual gymnasts. All entrants in the gymnastics competitions performed both a compulsory exercise and a voluntary exercise for each apparatus. The 2 exercise scores were summed to give an apparatus total. No separate finals were contested.

Exercise scores ranged from 0 to 10 and apparatus scores from 0 to 20.

Results

References
Official Olympic Report
www.gymnasticsresults.com
www.gymn-forum.net

Men's floor
Men's events at the 1956 Summer Olympics